Language of Flowers are a five piece indie-pop band originally from Belfast in Northern Ireland signed to San Francisco indie label Shelflife Records.  As of 2006 its members are located in London, Manchester and Belfast.  The band's sound is characteristic of the British C86 movement with heavy use of jangling Rickenbacker 12-string guitars, airy female vocals and bright pop melodies.

Language of Flowers Mk1 (1992)
Language of Flowers Mk1 started out in 1992 when friends Colm McCrory (bass guitar) and Marc McCourt (guitar) hastily assembled a band with their friend Jeff Lynas on vocals to support the twee pop band Heavenly after they had booked them to play in Derry, Northern Ireland.  This initial incarnation of the band split up immediately after their first gig (which included a cover of Velocity Girl by Primal Scream) after Heavenly's singer Amelia Fletcher compared their shambolic sound to riot grrrl band Huggy Bear, quite the opposite of the poppy, melodic Sarah Records influenced style they were aiming for.  They would not play again for over 10 years.

Language of Flowers Mk2 (2003–2007)
In 2003 Marc and Colm decided to reform the band after mutual friends Ashton Cameron and Tara Simpson had toyed with the idea of starting a Field Mice influenced band.  With Tara taking up vocal duties and Ashton on rhythm guitar they began searching for a drummer around Belfast. After exhausting the local area, Colm turned to Bentley Cooke, with whom he shared a flat with whilst living in Leicester in the mid-1990s but who was based in Manchester, England.  After recording a 4 track demo the band quickly signed to Shelflife and released their debut album Songs About You in 2004.  The album was well received by international fanzines with reviews noting the band's classic indie pop influences from the aforementioned bands Field Mice and Heavenly as well as The Smiths, Comet Gain, The Go-Betweens and Lush.

The band spent 2005-2006 playing across the UK with other indie pop bands Camera Obscura, Trembling Blue Stars, Malcolm Middleton and Pipas as well as touring around Northern Europe.

Language of Flowers disbanded in 2007.  Colm and Bentley have gone on to form the krautpop-lounge-gaze band Help Stamp Out Loneliness, whilst Marc is currently recording an album with his new Belfast Goth band, Solemn Novena.

Band members
 Tara Simpson - Vocals, Guitar, Percussion
 Marc McCourt - Guitar
 Colm McCrory - Bass Guitar, Vocals
 Stuart Philip Watson - Guitar
 Bentley Cooke - Drums
 Robert Cardwell - Drums
 Jeff Lynas - Guitar, Vocals
 Ciaran Neeson - Vocals
 Gavin Dunbar - Drums
 Michael Cassidy - Other Instrument

Former members

 David Ashton Cameron - Guitar

External links
 Shelflife Records

Musical groups from Belfast
Indie rock groups from Northern Ireland